TV 2 Livsstil is a Norwegian TV channel owned by the TV 2 Group. The channel replaces the previous channel TV 2 Bliss.

Contents 
The channel is focusing on lifestyle programs. Some of the regular shows are Keeping up with the Kardashians.

References

External links 
 

Livsstil
Television channels in Norway
Television channels and stations established in 2015
2015 establishments in Norway